The Freeze-Out is a 1921 American silent Western film directed by John Ford and starring Harry Carey. The film is considered to be a lost film.

Plot
As described in a film publication summary, the Stranger (Carey) comes to town of Broken Buckle to start a gambling hall. The Headlight, the existing gambling hall, is crooked, and the Stranger wants to start a straight one. He meets Zoe Whipple (Ferguson) who is attempting to reform the town and teaches school out of her home. Misunderstandings arise between the Stranger and Zoe that are brought about by Denver Red (Le Moyne), proprietor of the Headlight. After Zoe pleads with the Stranger not to start a new gambling den, the Stranger opens it to the public, but it turns out to be a new library and school. After running Denver out of town, the Stranger wins Zoe.

Cast
 Harry Carey as Ohio, the Stranger
 Helen Ferguson as Zoe Whipple
 Joe Harris as Headlight Whipple
 Charles Le Moyne as Denver Red
 J. Farrell MacDonald as Bobtail McGuire
 Lydia Yeamans Titus as Mrs. McGuire

See also
 Harry Carey filmography
 List of lost films

References

External links

 
 

1921 films
1921 lost films
1921 Western (genre) films
American black-and-white films
Films directed by John Ford
Lost Western (genre) films
Universal Pictures films
Lost American films
Silent American Western (genre) films
1920s American films